Godoy Cruz may refer to:

Godoy Cruz Department, a central department of Mendoza Province in Argentina
Godoy Cruz, Mendoza, a city in Godoy Cruz Department, Argentina
Tomás Godoy Cruz, (1791-1852), Argentine statesman and businessman
Godoy Cruz Antonio Tomba, an Argentine football club